The Red Solstice is a tactical shooter, survival game, developed and published by Ironward for PC. The game was released on July 10, 2014 through Steam's Early Access program. It is the first installment in The Red Solstice video game series. The Red Solstice had been in development for two and a half years. It uses an Ironward-created game engine, Razor.

In the year 117 AE (After Earth), a storm rages across the surface of Mars, a planet now colonized by humans driven from their home planet. Although terraforming is well under way, the alignment of the Martian northern winter solstice with the planet's closest approach to the Sun still triggers global dust storms sometimes lasting up to several weeks. During an exceptionally violent storm dubbed "The Red Solstice," the human colonies of Mars lose all contact with Tharsis, the colony referred to as "The Capital." Soldiers in the service of the Elysium Corporation, elite marine troops, were sent to find out what happened to the colony.

Gameplay
The gameplay of The Red Solstice is mostly team-based tactical shooting. It has a 1-8 players co-op. The game also has a variety of equipment and features. Playing well rewards different achievements and ranks. The Red Solstice also features an ailment system in which characters can bleed, become poisoned, or be affected by various ailments, creating a new and harder experience. The Red Solstice has various character classes ranging from heavy combat to support. Modules and armor pieces can be changed on marines to alter their stats ranging from ganging abilities to accuracy and speed.

The main campaign focuses on a marine called Tyler Hunt and his squad. They are sent to investigate a communications failure in the Tharsis colony, located on Mars. This portion of the game has a story that expands over to the multiplayer mode and provides information for every class.

Reception
The Red Solstice received generally positive reviews upon release. Britton Peele of GameSpot gave the game a 7 out of 10, saying:
Getting to the center of the storm that is The Red Solstice isn't easy. A less-than-stellar tutorial and initial overload of information combined with a handful of quirks and bugs make it a game you have to stick with for a little while before you can fully appreciate its depth. If you can reach that point, though, and you have some friends to reach it with, this a storm you will successfully weather.
The game holds 74% on Metacritic based on 12 reviews. On 5 November 2019, the game had achieved a 77.88% standing on GameRankings stars based on 8 reviews.

Sequel
A sequel, titled Red Solstice 2: Survivors was released on 17 June 2021 on the PC platform.

References

External links

 

2014 video games
Survival video games
Strategy video games
Multiplayer and single-player video games
Video games developed in Croatia
Windows-only games
Early access video games
Top-down video games
Tactical shooter video games